Monterey is a historic plantation house located at Roanoke, Virginia.  It was built about 1845, and is a two-story, banked, Greek Revival style brick dwelling with a spreading hipped roof.  Two additions were made to the original house after 1871, which gives it an "L"-shape.  The front facade features a full-width verandah style porch and the rear has a two-story gallery.  Also on the property is a contributing smoke house.

It was listed on the National Register of Historic Places in 1974.

It is owned by George Kegley, and sits on 116 acres of protected land. Mr and Mrs Kegley protected the land and home through a conservation easement with the Virginia Outdoors Foundation in cooperation with the Western Virginia Land Trust. The farm will be forever situated with just a few neighbors and two golf courses, one on either border of the protected area. It is the only easement on private land within Roanoke City limits.

Mr Kegley, 90 at the time of this edit, (Apr. 19), is still very active at the young age of 90. Mr Kegley is almost a full-time volunteer, working with the Historical Society of Western Virginia, Roanoke Valley Preservation Foundation, Blue Ridge Literacy Volunteers, RAM House, Rescue Mission,  St.Mark's Lutheran Church food pantry and a Lutheran summer camping program, in addition to Blue Ridge Land Conservancy.

Mrs. Kegley, Louise, died in January 2018 at the age of 85. The two were married for nearly 60 years at the time of her death.

References

https://www.blueridgelandconservancy.org/george.html

Plantation houses in Virginia
Houses on the National Register of Historic Places in Virginia
Greek Revival houses in Virginia
Houses completed in 1845
Houses in Roanoke, Virginia
National Register of Historic Places in Roanoke, Virginia